The Rushville Historic District is a historic district in Richland Township, Fairfield County Ohio which bounds the original village of Rushville.  The district is considered both historically and architecturally significant due to the preservation of many houses and commercial buildings representing a period from the 1820s to the early 1900s. It features examples of log construction, Gothic Revival, Federal, Italianate, and Queen Anne style architecture.

Founded by Joseph Turner in 1808, Rushville is one of the earliest settlements in Fairfield County and stands south of the original Zane's Trace road constructed by Colonel Ebenezer Zane in 1797. Zane's Trace ran from Wheeling, WV to Maysville, KY and was the first road into Ohio and lead to the establishment of the first towns in the interior of the state. Because of its location near this route Rushville became a successful commercial area which featured several inns, taverns, and merchant shops. Rushville was also a stop on the Underground Railroad in the years preceding the Civil War. Several prominent abolitionists lived in the village including the Rev. William Hanby and his son, composer Benjamin Hanby.

Today Rushville is bypassed by modern U.S. Route 22 which seems to have left the village largely untouched by change since the mid-20th century.  The District was added to the National Register of Historic Places in 1980.

The district includes 87 contributing buildings in a  area.

Gallery

References

National Register of Historic Places in Fairfield County, Ohio
Buildings and structures completed in 1810
Historic districts on the National Register of Historic Places in Ohio